John Vincent Power C.B.E. (born 29 April 1947 in Kilmacthomas, County Waterford) is an Irish music venue and festival owner, and founder of Mean Fiddler who lives and operates in London.

Biography 
On arrival in London from County Waterford, Power worked in various manual labour jobs, eventually moving into demolition, house clearances and most notably trading in second-hand furniture. Pioneering new methods of advertising his business, he soon had a host of second-hand furniture shops around North West London. The success of this business allowed him to pursue his first love, music, more specifically country & western.

A trip to Tennessee and a desire to bring the sound of Nashville to London prompted Power to open the original Mean Fiddler, his country and western club, in 1982, in Harlesden, North West London, establishing it as a key venue for up and coming talent, Irish music and country stars. It was the start of a £60m empire that expanded to eight major music festivals, 14 live music venues and a string of successful nightclubs and restaurants. This background in authentic music has seen him repeatedly promote many famous artists of the rock and roll era including Bob Dylan, Van Morrison, Roy Orbison, Paul Weller and Neil Young.

He is a controversial figure in the UK music scene, and has a reputation for his hands on approach to business, spotting gaps in the market and quickly moving into them. He has earned the nickname 'The Godfather of Gigs'.

In 1982 he opened The Mean Fiddler on the site of an old boxing gym in Harlesden. The venue quickly gained a reputation for its Irish music nights, showcasing new bands such as The Pogues and Billy Bragg. Within five years The Mean Fiddler was staging high-profile gigs by artists such as Roy Orbison, who played his last UK gig there in 1987, and Johnny Cash.

By the late 1980s it had become a showcase venue for new and established talent within the capital's expanding live music scene. It was the springboard for expansion into other venues and bars and created an opportunity for Mean Fiddler Group, with Power at the helm, to enter the UK outdoor music festival market.

Power moved to London at the age of 15 and resides there with his eight children.

Festivals 

Power helped popularise festivals in the UK through the rise of Reading, Leeds, The Phoenix, The Fleadh, Madstock, and numerous other one offs including the first Sex Pistols re-union in Finsbury Park.

In 1989, Mean Fiddler took over the organisation of the Reading Festival; acts included New Order, The Pogues, The Wonder Stuff and The Sugarcubes. Power is credited with reversing the fortunes of the long-established event, turning Reading into a highly anticipated and successful fixture on the annual festival calendar.

Power sold his stake in The Mean Fiddler Music Group plc in July 2005, and went on to set up Vince Power Music Group.

Power acquired one of Europe's most celebrated festivals, Benicàssim in 2005. Held in Spain, in a port town and beach resort located in Castelló, on the Costa del Azahar in Spain it is much more than just a music festival. Benicàssim Festival (FIB) sees over 100 acts perform over the four days; with four stages and eight days free camping. The festival is beach by day, music by night and is popular with thousands of UK festival goers who travel to Spain for the 'Glasto del Sol' experience each year. It was voted Best Overseas Festival in 2012 (UK Festival Awards), and features a line-up of international live acts, with a main focus on pop, rock and electronica artists.

Hop Farm Music Festival was launched in 2008 by Power, and has been held annually since at The Hop Farm Country Park in Paddock Wood, Kent, England. After its first year it was nominated for 'Best New Festival' at the UK Festival Awards. The Hop Farm Music Festival was born after a survey conducted among festival fans revealed that they always felt the lowest in priority and importance. The survey resulted in the first Hop Farm Music Festival. In 2008, a 30,000 crowd capacity festival centred on folk and independent music, with a specific aim of a return to "back to basics" organisation with a no sponsorship, no branding, no VIP attitude. Under 12's, since the festival's creation, have had free entry. Previous acts include Blondie, Prince and Peter Gabriel.

In September 2012, Vince Power Music Group entered administration and went into liquidation in November 2012, with a statement claiming "The board has in recent weeks pursued a number of different funding proposals but the company has not been able to procure the necessary funding it requires." Kent Police and artists who appeared at that years Hop Farm Festival, including Primal Scream, Suede and Peter Gabriel were not paid, with the festival's debts totalling more than £4.8 million.

July 2018 saw the launch of Power's new festival Feis, held at the Liverpool Pier Head. Billed as the city's "largest celebration of Irish artists", the line-up included musicians such as Van Morrison, The Chieftains, Imelda May and Shane MacGowan.

Festivals 

Below is a list of some of the festivals Power was involved in running, with Mean Fiddler or as a standalone promoter.
 Reading, Leeds
 Glastonbury
 Phoenix Festival
 Hop Farm Music Festival
 Benicàssim
 Tribal Gathering
 Homelands
 Feis Liverpool
 Fleadh (London, Chicago, San Jose, Boston, New York, Glasgow, Ireland, San Francisco)
 Madstock, Finsbury Park
 Big Love
 Gig on the Green, Glasgow
 NASS (National Adventure Sports Show)
 Jam in the Park

Charitable Work 

Power has been involved in a number of charitable organisations, particularly Cradle, a Bosnian Children's Charity.

Through various fundraising methods, including collections at the festivals, Power has helped to rebuild a primary school in Mostar, and in Thailand following the Tsumani. He is also closely associated with the Phillip Hall Memorial Fund, and is a patron of UNICEF, Human Rights Watch and the Depression Alliance.

Achievements and awards 

Power has promoted many shows and been involved with many projects at The Roundhouse and has donated to their redevelopment of The Roundhouse which will have the 'Vince Power Music Studio' in his honour as well as being a patron of its Millennial Committee.

In 2006, Power was appointed a CBE.

References

External links 
 Feis Liverpool Official Website

1947 births
20th-century Irish people
21st-century Irish people
Living people
Irish music people